Boniodendron is a genus of plant in the family Sapindaceae. It contains the following species:
 Boniodendron minus (Hemsl.) T.C.Chen
 Boniodendron parviflorum (Lecomte) Gagnep.

References

 
Sapindaceae genera
Taxonomy articles created by Polbot